Piedade is an island village located in Ilhas (also known as Tiswadi), a northern district in the state of Goa, India, and named after Our Lady of Compassion. The name comes from the Portuguese word , which means "compassion". It lies 23 km east of the state capital, Panjim, between the taluks of Satari (to the north) and Ponda (to the south). Other nearby villages are Amona (3 km), Volvoi (3 km), Surla (4 km), Cudnem (4 km), Betqui, and Candola (5 km). 

The local language is Konkani.

Churches

Nossa Senhora da Piedade Igreja

The Church of Our Lady of Compassion is located in Piedade. It was designed by a Goan priest in the early 18th century, and was the first Christian structure erected there. Also known as Our Lady of Piety.

Cemeteries

Piedade Cemetery 
The cemetery is located near the Church of Our Lady of Compassion on the hilltop. Due to a lack of space, many artistic graves have been made here with niches in the walls for burying the dead. It also houses a chapel.

Schools

Our Lady of Divar School 

Until the 20th century, the Our Lady of Divar School was the only school in the village. Due its red color, it was called Tambde Escola, or the 'Red School'.

Government 

The village panchayat is located in Goltim-Navelim and is walking distance from the school of Our Lady.

See also
 São Matias
 Divar

References

Villages in North Goa district